This article delineates the age of candidacy laws of the federal government and individual states of the United States.

Federal government 

 President of the United States and Vice President of the United States: 
 Minimum age: 35
 Per: Article II, Section 1, Clause 5 of the United States Constitution and Amendment XII of the United States Constitution
 United States Senator: 
 Minimum age: 30
 Per: Article I, Section 3, Clause 3 of the United States Constitution
 United States Representative: 
 Minimum age: 25
 Per: Article I, Section 2, Clause 2 of the United States Constitution

State government

* Qualified elector/registered voter requirement.
† State Senate membership requirement.
N.A. implies that such a position does not exist in that state.

Alaska
Astride Any public office: at least 30 (qualified voter requirement)

Arizona
 Any public office: at least 18

California
 Any public office: 18

Colorado
 Any public office: at least 21

Connecticut

Georgia
 Any public office: at least 18 (qualified voter requirement)

Hawaii
 Neighborhood Board Member: 18

Idaho
 Mayor: at 18

Illinois
 Comptroller: 25
School Board Member: 18 (qualified voter requirement)

Indiana
 Mayor: 18 (qualified voter requirement)

Iowa
 Any elected office: 18 (qualified voter requirement)

Louisiana
 Treasurer: 25
 School Board Member: 18 (qualified voter requirement)

Maryland
 Circuit Court Judge: 30
 County Sheriff: 25
 Other county offices: vary according to local law
 Any public office: at least 18 (qualified voter requirement)

Massachusetts
 Most offices: 21

Michigan
Governor or Lieutenant Governor: 30

State Senate or State House: 21

Judge: Licensed to practice law

All other offices: 18 (must be a registered and qualified elector)

Minnesota
 Many offices: 21

Montana
 Mayor: at least 21

Nebraska

Nevada
 Any public office: 18 (qualified voter requirement)

New Mexico
 Most offices: 18 (qualified elector requirement)

New York
 Comptroller: 30
 State Senator: 18
 State Assembly:18

North Carolina
 Many offices: 21
 Nonpartisan municipal offices: 18 (qualified voter requirement)

North Dakota
 Mayor/council: 18 (qualified voter requirement)

Oklahoma
 State, county, and municipal public offices: at least 18 (qualified voter requirement)

Oregon
 Sheriff: 21
 Other county and local offices: 18
 Justice of the Peace: 18

Pennsylvania
 Mayors of Third-Class Cities: 18

Rhode Island
 Any elected office: 18 (qualified voter requirement

South Carolina
 Judicial: 32

South Dakota
 Public Utilities Commissioner: 25
 Mayor/alderman: at least 18 (qualified voter requirement)

Tennessee
 Supreme Court Judge: 35
 Other state judges: 30
 County mayor/county executive: 30
 Sheriff: 25
 Constable: 21
 County School Board Member: 18 (registered voter requirement)
 State House of Representatives: 21
 State Senate: 35
 Governor: 30

Texas
 Any public office: at least 19 (qualified voter requirement)

Vermont
 Town officials: at least 18 (qualified voter requirement)

Virginia
 Any office: at least 18 (qualified voter requirement)

Washington
 Any office: at least 18 (qualified voter requirement)

Wisconsin
 Any city office: at least 18 (qualified voter requirement)

Wyoming
 Any municipal office: at least 18 (qualified voter requirement)

Local government

Many states require elected municipal officers to be at least 18 years of age or be a registered voter in the city thereof. Montana requires mayors to be at least 21 years of age.

As of November 2016, most U.S. cities with populations exceeding 200,000 required their mayor to be a registered voter in the city thereof or at least 18 years of age. Here are the following exceptions:
30 Years: Denver, CO; Honolulu, HI; Memphis, TN; Nashville, TN; St. Louis, MO
25 Years: Baltimore, MD; Colorado Springs, CO; Columbus, GA; Glendale, AZ; Kansas City, MO; Omaha, NE; Philadelphia, PA; Washington, DC Westminster, MD
21 Years: Louisville, KY, Oklahoma City, OK; Aurora, CO
19 Years: Hialeah, FL (qualified voter requirement + 1 year of residence)
No Age Minimum Listed or Implied: Minneapolis, MN; Pittsburgh, PA; Saint Paul, MN; Wichita, KS; Jersey City, NJ; Buffalo, NY; Yonkers, NY; Troy, NC
Data unavailable: Birmingham, AL; Newark, NJ

Baltimore
 City Comptroller, and City Council President: 25
 City Council Member: 21

References

Electoral restrictions
candidacy laws in the United States
United States election law